The Iganga–Tirinyi–Kamonkoli–Mbale Road, also known as the Nakalama–Tirinyi–Kamonkoli–Mbale Road, is a road in the Eastern Region of Uganda, connecting the towns of Iganga in Iganga District, Namutumba in Namutumba District, Tirinyi in Kibuku District, Kamonkoli in Budaka District, and Mbale in Mbale District.

Location
The coordinates of the road at Tirinyi are 1°00'07.0"N, 33°45'51.0"E (Latitude: 1.001930; 33.764164).

Overview
This road is an important national road, under the supervision of the Uganda National Roads Authority (UNRA).

The road was upgraded to class II bitumen surface before 2001, with loan assistance from the African Development Bank. Since the upgrade, the road has been plagued by recurrent surface erosion, sinkholes, and vandalism.

The government of Uganda (GOU), through UNRA, plans to fund a rehabilitation of this road. As of April 2015, the road rehabilitation project was classified as "Ongoing", fully funded by GOU.

On 21 January 2022, the upgraded and resurfaced road was commissioned by Robinah Nabbanja, the Prime Minister of Uganda. The  single carriageway transport corridor was rehabilitated and improved to class II bitumen standard by Dott Services, fully funded by he Ugandan government. The rehabilitated road's projected lifespan is 15 years from date of completion.

See also
 List of roads in Uganda

References

External links
 Website of Uganda National Roads Authority
 Tirinyi Road In Namutumba District, Eastern Uganda As of 5 May 2016.

Roads in Uganda
Mbale District
Budaka District
Kibuku District
Namutumba District
Iganga District